The following is a list of notable persons interred in Woodlawn Cemetery (Bronx, New York).

A 
 Charles H. Adams, politician
 Anthony Allaire
 Vivian Beaumont Allen
 Vincent Alo
  Anastasia, Princess of Greece and Denmark buried with her parents in the family mausoleum.
 John Murray Anderson
 Alexander Archipenko
 Herman Ossian Armour
 Hugh D. Auchincloss
 James C. Auchincloss

B 
 Benjamin Babbitt
 Jules Bache
 James Anthony Bailey
 Jacob Baiz
 Joseph C. Baldwin
 Billy Bang
 Frances Elizabeth Barrow
 Diana Barrymore
 Nora Bayes
 Charles Becker
 Digby Bell
 Laura Joyce Bell
 Alva Belmont
 Oliver Belmont
 Irving Berlin, songwriter and musician
 Maximilian Berlitz
 Samuel Betts
 Amelia Bingham
 Ausburn Birdsall
 Elizabeth Bisland
 Cornelius Bliss
 Nellie Bly
 Coralie Blythe
 George Boldt
 Robert W. Bonynge
 Emma Booth, involved with the Salvation Army
 Gail Borden
 Bostwick family
 Anne Lynch Botta
 William V. Brady, Mayor of New York City
 Josephine Brandell
 Boris Brasol
 Herbert Brenon
 Bricktop
 Benjamin Bristow
 Addison Brown
 Henry Bruckner, Bronx Borough President
 Charles Waldron Buckley
 Ralph Bunche, United Nations official and diplomat
 Richard Busteed
 Benjamin Franklin Butler (1795–1858), lawyer
 Charles Butler

C 
 Hervey C. Calkin
 Harry Carey
 Charles A. Carleton
 Diahann Carroll
 Vernon and Irene Castle, well-known husband & wife dancing team, movie stars
 Carrie Chapman Catt
 Alfred Chapin
 John Wilbur Chapman, Evangelist, Author, Hymn Writer
 Robert Chesebrough
 Joseph Hodges Choate, lawyer, diplomat
 Bobby Clark (comedian)
 Horace F. Clark
 Huguette Clark
 William A. Clark
 Henry Clews
 George M. Cohan – bronze statue in center of Times Square
 Ornette Coleman
 Barron Collier
 Samuel Colman,  painter, interior designer, and writer
 Ida Conquest
 Austin Corbin
 Ricardo Cortez
 Lotta Crabtree
 Charles Nelson Crittenton
 William Nelson Cromwell
 Celia Cruz
 Countee Cullen
 Frederick Kingsbury Curtis

D 
 Leopold Damrosch
 Jess Dandy
 Miles Davis
 Clarence Day
 Zachariah Deas
 Cornelius H. DeLamater
 George W. De Long
 Rafael Díez de la Cortina y Olaeta, linguist
 Sidney Dillon
 E.L. Doctorow
 Charles Cleveland Dodge, Brigadier General (youngest), American Civil War
 William E. Dodge
 Richard Dorson
 Elsie Driggs, painter of Precisionism
 Paul Du Chaillu
 Vernon Duke
 Finley Peter Dunne
 William C. Durant

E 
 Gertrude Ederle, record-setting swimmer
 Gus Edwards, songwriter and vaudevillian
 Duke Ellington
 Albert Ellis

F 
 Benjamin L. Fairchild
 David Farragut
 Edoardo Ferrari-Fontana
 Bud Fisher
 Clara Fisher
 Rudolph Fisher
 Clyde Fitch
 Geraldine Fitzgerald
 James Montgomery Flagg
 Joe Foy, baseball player
 Frankie Frisch, baseball player
 Antoinette Perry Frueauff

G 
 Tommy Gagliano
 Lindley Miller Garrison
 Francis Patrick Garvan
 John Warne Gates
 Charles Sidney Gilpin
 Thomas F. Gilroy, Mayor of New York City
 Ambrosio José Gonzales
 Jay Gould
 Archibald Gracie
 Archibald Gracie III, Confederate General
 Archibald Gracie IV, Titanic survivor
 Charles K. Graham, Union General & Civil Engineer
 George Bird Grinnell, anthropologist, historian, naturalist, and writer.
 Lawrence Grossmith, English actor
 Simon Guggenheim

H 
 The Haffen family of Haffen Brewing Company are buried on 'brewers' row.'
 Oscar Hammerstein, Sr.
 Lionel Hampton
 W. C. Handy
 Edward Harkness, philanthropist
 Lamon V. Harkness, businessman, stockholder in Standard Oil, yachtsman
 William L. Harkness
 Charles K. Harris
 William Frederick Havemeyer, businessman, Mayor of New York City
 William Haviland, actor
 Coleman Hawkins
 Millicent Hearst
 August Heckscher
 John Held, Jr.
 Victor Herbert
 Adelaide Herrmann
 Alexander Herrmann
 Christian Archibald Herter
 John D. Hertz, businessman, thoroughbred racehorse owner and breeder
 Jim Holdsworth, baseball player
 Celeste Holm, actress
 Richard Hudnut
 Charles Evans Hughes, 11th Chief Justice of the United States
 Frederick P. Hummel
 Harold Hunter, skateboarder
 Arabella Huntington – cenotaph as she is buried in California
 Collis P. Huntington
 Barbara Hutton
 Henry Baldwin Hyde

J 
 Milt Jackson
 Illinois Jacquet
 Fanny Janauschek
 Bumpy Johnson
 Augustus D. Juilliard

K
 Hermann Jakob Knapp
 Felix Knight
 Pedro Knight
 Fritz Kreisler

L 
 Fiorello La Guardia
 Scott La Rock
 Daniel S. Lamont

 Walter W. Law
 Canada Lee
 Henry Lehman
 Frank Leslie
 J. C. Leyendecker, illustrator
 Harold Lockwood
 Frank Belknap Long, horror author
 Mansfield Lovell, Confederate officer
 August Guido Lüchow, restaurateur
 George Platt Lynes

M 
 A. Kingsley Macomber, businessman, Thoroughbred racehorse owner and breeder
 Rowland Macy
 Frankie Manning, dancer, instructor, and choreographer
 Martha Mansfield
 Vito Marcantonio, politician
 Dewey Markham
 Alfred Erskine Marling
 Louis Marx, toy merchant
 Bat Masterson, lawman, writer
 Victor Maurel
 William McAdoo
 Josiah Calvin McCracken
 Alice Foote MacDougall, restaurateur
 George A. McGuire
 Jackie McLean, musician
 George McManus, cartoonist
 Roi Cooper Megrue, playwright
 Marie Mattingly Meloney
 Herman Melville, author
 Dean Meminger
 Mario Merola (1922–1987), lawyer, New York City Councilman, and Bronx County District Attorney
 William P. Merrill
 Harry F. Millarde (1885–1931), silent film actor and director
 Cyrus Miller, lacrosse player
 Gilbert Miller
 Marilyn Miller
 Norma Miller
 Florence Mills
 John Purroy Mitchel, Mayor of New York City
 John Bassett Moore
 George L. K. Morris (1905–1975), Cubist artist, writer, and editor
 Paul Morton
 Robert Moses, government official, planner, builder, and Parks Department Commissioner of New York City
 Bernarr McFadden Founder of the Physical Culture Hotel in Dansville, NY, McFadden Publications

N 
 Thomas Nast, political cartoonist
 LeRoy Neiman, artist
 Harold Nicholas
 Ruth Rowland Nichols
 Hideyo Noguchi
 James W. Nye

O 
 Blanche Oelrichs
 Hermann Oelrichs
 William Butler Ogden
 Chauncey Olcott
 Joe "King" Oliver
 Dave Orr

P 
 Augustus G. Paine, Jr.
 Felix Pappalardi
 Dorothy Parker (ashes reburied at Woodlawn in 2020)
 James Cash Penney
 Antoinette Perry, actress, director and co-founder of the American Theatre Wing
 Alex Pompez, African-American baseball executive
 Generoso Pope
 George B. Post
 Otto Preminger, film director
 Samuel I. Prime
 Frederick Freeman Proctor, vaudeville impresario
 Joseph Pulitzer, newspaper owner and founder of Pulitzer prize
 Mihajlo Pupin
 Hovsep Pushman (1877–1966), American artist of Armenian background

R 
 Charles Ranhofer
 Norman B. Ream
 Theodor Reik
 Gaetano Reina
 Lance Reventlow
 Grantland Rice
 Vincent Richards
 Tex Rickard
 Max Roach
 Delmar "Barney" Roos
 Margaret Rudkin, Pepperidge Farm founder
 Dick Rudolph, major league baseball pitcher, one of 17 who was allowed to continue to throw the spitball after baseball made against the rules in 1920
 Damon Runyon

S 
 Alexander P. de Seversky, a Russian-American aviation pioneer and inventor
 Louis Sherry, restaurateur, caterer, confectioner and hotelier
 Ada "Bricktop" Smith, dancer, jazz singer, vaudevillian and saloon-keeper
 Ruth Brown Snyder, murderer
 Elizabeth Cady Stanton, early women's rights activist
 Joseph Stella, artist
 Josef Stránský, Czech conductor, composer, and art collector
 Ida Straus
 Isidor Straus – owner of Macy's Department Store, Democratic member of the 53rd Congress of the United States, victim of the sinking of the RMS Titanic
 William Lafayette Strong, Mayor of New York City
 William Matheus Sullivan, prominent New York City lawyer and patron of music
 Karl Struss

T 
 Arthur Fitzwilliam Tait, artist
 Jōkichi Takamine
 Clarice Taylor
 Ben Teal, theater director
 Jerry Thomas, bartender
 Olive Thomas
 James Walter Thompson, businessman, advertiser
 Lloyd Tilghman, Confederate General
 Dan Topping
 Henry E. Tremain, Civil War Medal of Honor recipient, author, lawyer
 Ada Bampton Tremaine, philanthropist
 Cicely Tyson

U 
 Vladimir Ussachevsky
 Gladys Unger
 Irwin Untermyer
 Samuel Untermyer

V 
 Abraham Van Buren
 Robert Anderson Van Wyck, first Mayor of Greater New York City
 Virginia Fair Vanderbilt

W 
 Madam C. J. Walker
 Arthur Mellen Wellington
 William Collins Whitney
 Bert Williams
 Ann Woodward
 Frank Winfield Woolworth
 James Hood Wright

References

Lists of people from New York City
Bronx-related lists